Blabericolidae is a family of parasitic alveolates in the phylum Apicomplexia.

Taxonomy

There are two genera in this family: Blabericola and Protomagalhaensia. Each genus has five recognised species.

History

This family was created by Clopton in 2009.

Description

Species in the family infect cockroaches.

The type genus is Blabericola, and the type species is Blabericola migrator. The type host is the Madagascar hissing cockroach (Gromphadorhina portentosa).

References

Apicomplexa families